USS Sentinel may refer to the following ships of the United States Navy:

 , a motorboat built in 1917 by Pacific Shipyards and Ways Co., Alameda, California; renamed Tulare
 , a motorboat built in 1918 by Richardson Boat Co., North Tonawanda, New York, for the U.S. Coast Guard
 , an oceangoing minesweeper built in 1941
 , scheduled to be built as part of Lend-Lease, but the contract was canceled in 1945
 , new name for USS LCI(L)-1052, built in 1944

References 

United States Navy ship names